Veikko Rantanen (5 January 1932 – 28 January 2014) was a Finnish wrestler. He competed at the 1956 Summer Olympics and the 1960 Summer Olympics.

References

External links
 

1932 births
2014 deaths
Finnish male sport wrestlers
Olympic wrestlers of Finland
Wrestlers at the 1956 Summer Olympics
Wrestlers at the 1960 Summer Olympics
People from Sysmä
Sportspeople from Päijät-Häme
20th-century Finnish people
21st-century Finnish people